is a three-day South American folk festival held annually in Kawamata, Fukushima, Japan. The name "Cosquín en Japón" is derived from the Cosquín Festival held in Cosquín, Argentina.

In 1981, the festival was moved to the Kawamata Central Public Hall, due to an increase in the number of performing groups, and in 2002 was expanded to become a three-day festival. Top performers and professionals from Japan and overseas now attend the festival, which is currently the largest Andean music festival in the country. In 2006, 161 groups performed, making it the largest Cosquín yet.

International exchange
Increased awareness of Cosquín en Japón has deepened international ties with Argentina and the city of Cosquín. During the Japanese hosting of the 2002 FIFA World Cup, residents of Kawamata, at the urging of Argentina, formed a Japanese-style cheer club to cheer on the Argentinian team.

The Argentinian ambassador to Japan and the mayor of Cosquín have paid visits to Kawamata. Residents of Kawamata, including the mayor, have also visited Cosquín. Since 1999, Cosquín en Japón has held an annual contest to send representatives of Japan to the original Cosquín Festival in Argentina.

Awards
1993: 
2002: The  awarded to Kawamata

References

Argentine music
Andean music
Music festivals in Japan
Tourist attractions in Fukushima Prefecture
Music festivals established in 1975
Folk festivals in Japan
Latin American festivals
Kawamata, Fukushima